The 2011–13 ICC Intercontinental Cup is the sixth edition of the ICC Intercontinental Cup, an international first-class cricket tournament between leading associate members of the International Cricket Council. The tournament will run from June 2011 to October 2013. The format has been changed since the 2009–10 edition. The previous two-division system has been replaced by a single eight-team division, comprising the six teams from 2010 ICC World Cricket League Division One (Afghanistan, Canada, Ireland, Kenya, Netherlands, and Scotland) and the top two teams from 2011 ICC World Cricket League Division Two (Namibia and United Arab Emirates).

For the first time, a one-day tournament, the 2011–13 ICC World Cricket League Championship, will run in parallel with the first-class tournament.

Fixtures

The breakdown of fixtures for the ICC Intercontinental Cup 2011–13 is as follows:

Points table

Win – 14 points
Draw if more than 10 hours of play lost – 7 points (otherwise 3 points)
First Innings leader – 6 points (independent of result)
Abandoned without a ball played – 10 points.

Matches

Round 1

Round 2

Round 3

Round 4

Round 5

Round 6

Round 7

Final

Statistics

Most runs

Most wickets

References

External links
 ICC Intercontinental Cup on ESPN Cricinfo

ICC Intercontinental Cup
ICC Intercontinental Cup
ICC Intercontinental Cup
ICC Intercontinental Cup
Intercontinental Cup
Intercontinental Cup
Intercontinental Cup